The High Performance Computing Collaboratory (HPC²) at Mississippi State University, an evolution of the MSU/National Science Foundation Engineering Research Center for Computational Field Simulation, is a coalition of member centers and institutes that share a common core objective of advancing the state-of-the-art in computational science and engineering using high performance computing; a common approach to research that embraces a multi-disciplinary, team-oriented concept; and a commitment to a full partnership between education, research, and service. The mission of the HPC² is to serve the University, State, and Nation through excellence in computational science and engineering.

The HPC² comprises seven independent research centers/institutes with the common characteristics of a multi-disciplinary, team-oriented effort that is strategically involved in the application and advancement of computational science and engineering using high performance computing.
 Alliance for System Safety of UAS through Research Excellence (ASSURE)
 Center for Advanced Vehicular Systems (CAVS)
 Center for Cyber Innovation (CCI)
 Center for Computational Sciences (CCS)
 Geosystems Research Institute (GRI)
 Institute for Genomics, Biocomputing and Biotechnology (IGBB)
 Northern Gulf Institute (NGI)

Additional links 
 High Performance Computing Collaboratory (HPC2) website
 Mississippi State University website

  Northern Gulf Institute (NGI)]

Mississippi State University
Supercomputer sites